Group A of the 2014–15 EuroChallenge consisted of SPM Shoeters Den Bosch, Södertälje Kings, ratiopharm Ulm, and Enel Basket Brindisi. Play began on 4 November and ended on 16 December 2014.

Teams

Standings

Results

Round 1

Round 2

Round 3

Round 4

Round 5

Round 6

Statistical Leaders

References

Group A
2014–15 in Dutch basketball
2014–15 in Italian basketball
2014–15 in Swedish basketball
2014–15 in German basketball